The Cosmic Infrared Background ExpeRiment (CIBER) was a payload flown aboard Black Brant XII sounding rockets to collect data about cosmic infrared background. In 2014 results from CIBER indicated an excess of infrared light, beyond what is emitted by galaxies.

After the conclusion of the CIBER mission, the research into cosmic infrared background is being (as of 2021) pursued by a follow-on mission, CIBER-2. CIBER-2 is a successor to CIBER using similar techniques (with improvements, naturally) and also launching into suborbital space aboard a sounding rocket. CIBER-2 was launched on 7 June 2021 aboard a Black Brant IX rocket.

References

External links
CIBER Home Page
NASA CIBER 4 Page

NASA programs
Infrared telescopes
2014 in science
Sounding rockets